(b. 9 August 1981 in Saga, Japan) is a Japanese rugby union player. He plays as a prop.

Yamamura had the qualities to become a sumo professional, but preferred rugby instead. He plays for Kanto Gakuin University. He is regularly picked for the Japan national rugby union team. He played one match at the 2003 Rugby World Cup and four matches at the 2007 Rugby World Cup.

Clubs
 Kanto Gakuin University
 Yamaha Jubilo

Honours
 40 caps for Japan national rugby union team, with 1 try scored, 5 points in aggregate.

External links
  Statistics at itsrugby.fr
 Photo and biography

Japanese rugby union players
Rugby union props
1981 births
Living people
Kanto Gakuin University alumni
Japan international rugby union players
Shizuoka Blue Revs players